The 2001 Atlantic Coast Conference men's basketball tournament took place from March 8–11 in Atlanta, Georgia, at the Georgia Dome. Duke won the tournament for the third year in a row, defeating North Carolina in the championship game. Duke's Shane Battier won the tournament's Most Valuable Player award.

Duke went on to win the 2001 NCAA Division I men's basketball tournament in the following weeks. It was their third national championship. Duke defeated ACC rival Maryland in the Final Four. Duke also defeated Maryland in the ACC semifinal round.

The 2001 ACC Tournament Championship Game pitted the #1 and #2 seeds against each other for the second consecutive year. 

The 2001 edition of the ACC Tournament was the first one held in the Georgia Dome. The tournament had previously been held in Atlanta at the Omni. The tournament returned to the Georgia Dome in 2009. The tournament format reverted to the format last used in 1997, featuring a first round game between the two lowest seeds, with the remaining teams receiving byes to the quarterfinals. The previous format had the #1 seed facing the #9 seed in the first round, with the winner receiving a bye to the semifinals, while the #7 and #8 seeds played in the first round to determine which would join the #2 to #6 seeds in quarterfinals.

Bracket

AP rankings at time of tournament

References

External links
 

Tournament
ACC men's basketball tournament
ACC men's basketball tournament
ACC men's basketball tournament
2001 in Atlanta
College basketball tournaments in Georgia (U.S. state)
Basketball competitions in Atlanta